Lukey may refer to:

 Len Lukey (died 1978), Australian racing driver, winner of the 1959 Australian Drivers' Championship
 T. V. H. Lukey, a co-creator of the English Mastiff dog breed
 Lucas "Lukey" Ebenezer Hinks, a character in the comic strip Barney Google and Snuffy Smith
 "Lukey's Boat", a comical folk song retitled "Lukey" for the Great Big Sea album Up
 Lukey, a brand owned by Tenneco, an American Fortune 500 company